Ghulam Fariduddin Ayaz Al-Hussaini  Qawwal (born in Hyderabad, India) is a Pakistani Sufi devotional singer. He belongs to the Qawwal Bachchon Ka Gharana of Delhi. 

He and his relatives are the flag-bearers of that school of music (gharana), which is also known by the name of the city as the Delhi gharana. He performs various genres of Hindustani classical music such as dhrupad, khayal, tarana, thumri, and dadra. Ayaz leads the qawwal party with his younger brother, Abu Muhammad.

Fareed Ayaz is a descendant of Mir Qutub Bakhsh, who was awarded the title of Tanras Khan by the last Mughal Emperor Bahadur Shah Zafar. Tanras Khan was also the tutor in music and court musician of Zafar.

Early life
Fareed Ayaz was born in Hyderabad, India in 1952. In 1956, his family shifted to Karachi, Pakistan. He started his training in classical music with his father Munshi Raziuddin Ahmed Khan Qawwal. Their roots can be traced to the family tree of one of the earliest disciples of Amir Khusro. Their father Munshi Raziuddin Qawwal also used to sing with his cousins Qawwal Bahauddin Khan and Manzoor Niazi Qawwal (maternal uncle of Farid) early in his career.

His nephew Hamza Akram is also a qawwali singer.

Career
Fareed Ayaz & Abu Muhammad  Qawwal Brothers are popular for their Sufi performances. They are considered the most popular Qawwal party in Pakistan and one of the only few left. They have performed in the United Kingdom, United States, Canada, France, Germany, Italy, Netherlands, Portugal, Austria, India, Bahrain, Kenya, Nepal, Zimbabwe, Bangladesh, Croatia, Turkey, Morocco, Greece, Egypt, Bulgaria, Tunisia, Belgium, Iran, Oman, United Arab Emirates, Saudi Arabia, Jordan, Romania, Mauritius, Hong Kong and South Africa by Bazme Chirag e Faqir Chishti International a non-profit Sufi organization.

They also performed at Aman ki Asha, organised by Times of India and Pakistan's Jang Group of Newspapers.

Songs 
 Kangna (2011) Coke Studio (Pakistan) (featured in the 2012 film The Reluctant Fundamentalist)
 Mori Bangri (2011) Coke Studio (Pakistan)
 Aaj Rung Hai (2012) Coke Studio (Pakistan)
 Khabram Raseeda (2012) Coke Studio (Pakistan)
 Ghar Nari (2016) (featured in 2016 film Ho Mann Jahaan)
Jaag Musafir (2016) (featured in 2016 film Mah e Mir)
Khabar-e-Tahayyur-e-Ishq Sun (2016) (Drama OST Deewana (TV series))
 Nami Danam Ke Akhir Choon (with Urdu translation)- Fareed Ayaz
"Balamwa" (2017) (featured in 2017 film Rangreza) - sung with Hamza Akram & Abu Muhammad
Shikwa/Jawab-e-Shikwa (2018) Coke Studio Pakistan (season 11) collaboration with Natasha Baig
 Piya Ghar Aaya (2018) Coke Studio Pakistan (season 11)
 Aadam (2019) Coke Studio Pakistan (season 12)

Awards and recognition
 Pride of Performance Award by the President of Pakistan in 2020.

See also
 List of Pakistani qawwali singers

References

External links
Fareed Ayaz, Abu Muhammad Qawwal and Brothers perform at Asia Society - videoclip on YouTube

Year of birth missing (living people)
Place of birth missing (living people)
Living people
Pakistani musicians
Pakistani qawwali singers
Muhajir people
Musicians from Karachi
Pakistani qawwali groups
Indian emigrants to Pakistan
Coke Studio (Pakistani TV program)
Recipients of the Pride of Performance